The Nematoceran family Axymyiidae is the sole member of the infraorder Axymyiomorpha, though it is often included within the infraorder Bibionomorpha in older classifications. It is known from only nine species in four genera, plus eight fossil species.

Family characteristics

The Axymyiidae have the general appearance of the Bibionidae. Unlike bibionids, axymyiids have four branches of the radial vein, Bibionidae have two or three.

The head is rounded. The eyes of the male are holoptic for a considerable distance and divided into a larger dorsal part consisting of large facets and (separated by a groove) a smaller ventral part of smaller facets. The eyes of the female are separated by a broad frons and consist of separated facets. The three ocelli are on a prominence. The antennae are short with 14 to 16 transverse segments which are covered with sparse, short hairs. The oral parts are reduced. The palpi are four- to five-segmented.

Wings have an ocellus. Wing-venation: The subcostal vein merges into the anterior alar margin near its midpoint; radial vein 1 reaches the distal quarter of wings, there usually fused with radial vein 2+3; radial vein 4 is branched proximal to the anterior crossvein of the wing. Median vein 1 and 2 have short trunks. The anal vein does not reach the  alar margin.

The tibiae are slightly longer than the femora, but somewhat shorter than the tarsi. The empodium and pulvilli are well developed.

Biology
Larvae live in decomposing wood.

Genera
The family contains four extant genera and four extinct genera:
Axymyia 
Axymyia furcata 
Mesaxymyia 
Mesaxymyia kerteszi 
Mesaxymyia stackelbergi 
Plesioaxymyia 
Plesioaxymyia vespertina 
Protaxymyia 
Protaxymyia japonica 
Protaxymyia melanoptera 
Protaxymyia sinica 
Protaxymyia taiwanensis 
Protaxymyia thuja 
†Juraxymyia 
†Juraxymyia evae 
†Juraxymyia fossilis 
†Juraxymyia krzeminskii 
†Psocites 
†Psocites pectinatus 
†Raraxymyia 
†Raraxymyia parallela 
†Raraxymyia proxima 
†Sinaxymyia 
†Sinaxymyia rara 
†Sinaxymyia szadziewskii

References

Krivosheina, M. G. 2000. A. 2. Family Axymyiidae, pp. 31–39. In L. Papp, and B. Darvas [eds.]. Contribution to a Manual of the Palaearctic Diptera, Appendix. Science Herald, Budapest, Hungary.
B. M. Mamaev Family Axymyiidae in Bei-Bienko, G. Ya, 1988 Keys to the insects of the European Part of the USSR Volume 5 (Diptera) Part 2 English edition.
Mamaev, B. M. 1968. New nematocerous Diptera of the USSR fauna (Diptera, Axymyiidae, Mycetobiidae, Sciaridae, Cecidomyiidae). Entomol. Oboz. 47: 605–616.
Mamaev, B. M., and N. P. Krivosheina. 1966. New data on the taxonomy and biology of Diptera of the family Axymyiidae. Entomol. Obozr. 45: 168–180.

External links
UBC Diptera Description of Order and Families in British Columbia Family description.

Nematocera families
Axymyiomorpha
Taxa named by Raymond Corbett Shannon